Woodville is a town in and the county seat of Wilkinson County, Mississippi, United States. Its population as of 2020 was 928.

History

This historic town, one of the oldest in Mississippi, is set among the rolling hills and pastures of Wilkinson County, just north of the Louisiana-Mississippi border in the southwest corner of the state. It was incorporated in 1811, after the Louisiana Purchase of 1803 and not long before Mississippi's admission to the United States in 1817.

It was developed along the historic corridor between St. Francisville, Louisiana, 24 miles to the south and Natchez, Mississippi, 34 miles to the north. Since pre-colonial times, communities within this corridor have been linked, first by the Lower Natchez Trace, a footpath and portage developed by Native Americans and serving the east bank of the Mississippi River. In the 20th century, U.S. Highway 61, the "Blues Highway," was later built along this route; it is considered the spine of blues music.

Painter John James Audubon visited Woodville during his sojourn in St. Francisville in the 1820s. Here he found more than 26 of the species which he documented and painted for his Birds of America series.

Numerous residents are descended from 18th-century settlers. Much of its significant architecture was built in the 19th century when cotton was the chief commodity crop and generating great profits for major planters. The community has organized the Woodville Main Street Association; the Wilkinson County – Woodville Public Library; and the Wilkinson County Museum and the African-American Museum, both restored and owned by the Woodville Civic Club.  

Among the Main Street Association's initiatives are the Woodville Hospitality Station, providing tourist information and a rest stop to travelers on Highway 61, near the town boundary. The annual Deer and Wildlife Festival is staged each October on and around the Courthouse Square. The Civic Club has published three volumes of The Journal of Wilkinson County. A fourth book is in the works.

A public school system (Wilkinson County School District) and a private alternative, the Wilkinson County Christian Academy (WCCA), offer co-educational grades K through 12. The town has a medical clinic and churches with active Catholic, Episcopal, Methodist, Baptist, and Presbyterian congregations.

Woodville was developed based on two commodities: cotton and timber. The first was most important during the antebellum period. Planters developed numerous Wilkinson County cotton plantations, based on the intensive labor of enslaved Africans, with many relocated to the region from the Upper South. 

Merchants served the planters' families and freedmen after the Civil War. To get cotton to market, planters supported construction of the West Feliciana Railroad, the oldest standard-gauge system in the country, which once extended from Woodville to Bayou Sara, on the Mississippi River just south of St. Francisville. The West Feliciana Railroad had a terminus on Depot Street, where the railroad's office was located.

The planter community thrived from the 1830s until the Civil War. It began to recover in the late 19th century, as the labor system settled into most freedmen working as sharecroppers or tenant farmers. Cotton continued to be important until 1920, by which time the boll weevil had decimated the cotton crop. In that second period of prosperity, the town was called "Little Jerusalem." Sephardic Jewish businessmen came for economic opportunities and made significant contributions to the town's built environment and culture. Most of them later moved away. Woodville's synagogue burned in the 1930s, but its Jewish cemetery may be visited.

Woodville remains notable for its role in a flourishing timber industry; the dedication and commitment of its residents, many of whom are third and fourth generation; its assemblage of 19th-century buildings in various classic styles; and its abundance of outdoor recreation, hunting and fishing in particular. Exploratory oil and gas drilling is taking place in the county.

The town is home to the oldest continuously operating newspaper in Mississippi, the  Woodville Republican, founded by W. A. Chisholm in 1821. It is published weekly by a great-grandson of John S. Lewis. who settled here in 1810. His family acquired the paper in 1878. The grocery store is Treppendahl's Super Foods, operated by a great-grandson of the first owner. The Treppendahls are now sixth-generation Woodvillians.

Woodville's town plan is centered on a courthouse square planted with ancient oaks. The turn-of-the-20th century Beaux Arts-style courthouse has a spire. More than 100 buildings contribute to Woodville's National Register Historic District: they include structures from the first quarter of the 19th century, with examples of Federal, Eastlake, Arts and Crafts, Greek Revival, Beaux Arts, and Neo-classical architecture.  Fronting Courthouse Square are the monumental office and banking house of the West Feliciana Railroad (c. 1834). 

The former railroad office now serves as the Wilkinson County Museum. The classic Federal-style former Branch Banking House of the State of Mississippi (c. 1819), the state's oldest existing bank building, has been adapted to serve as the African-American Museum.

Notable domestic architecture includes the Neo-classical Lewis house (c. 1832) at 458 Church St., the monumental Feltus-Catchings house (c. 1820) at the southwest corner of First South and Depot, the Greek Revival Carnot Posey House (c. 1845) at 432 Church St., and the John William Goddard house at 940 Main Street.

Geography

Demographics

Per the 2020 United States census, there were 928 people, 386 households, and 277 families residing in the town; its racial composition was 77.95% black, 22.38% non-Hispanic white, 0.22% Native American, 0.11% Asian, 2.8% other or mixed, and 0.54% Hispanic or Latino of any race.

Education

Wilkinson County School District serves Woodville. There are three education facilities near Woodville: Wilkinson County Elementary School, Wilkinson County High School, and the private school Wilkinson County Christian Academy, which was established in 1969 as a segregation academy.

Media
The Woodville Republican, a weekly newspaper founded in 1823, is the oldest surviving business (and thus the oldest newspaper) in Mississippi.

Notable people

 Julia K. Wetherill Baker (18581931), writer and poet, was born in Woodville
 Betty Bentley Beaumont (1828-1892), author, merchant, cotton factor, hotel owner
 Henry Cohen (rabbi), served here from 1885 to 1888 before going to Galveston, Texas, where he became a nationally known community leader
 Jefferson Davis, President of the Confederate States of America; lived near here for a couple of years as a youth on his parents' plantation and attended Woodville Academy, before going to Kentucky to school. 
 Ronnie Edwards, Louisiana politician, born in Woodville
 Will E. Keller, businessman
 Rudolph Matthews, handball player
 Edward Grady Partin (1924-1990), born in Woodville, he became a Teamsters Union business agent from Baton Rouge. His testimony sent Jimmy Hoffa to prison.
 Carnot Posey, Civil War Confederate general
 Peter Randolph, antebellum-era Federal judge
 Dan Reneau, President of Louisiana Tech University
 William Grant Still, African-American classical composer and Mississippi Musicians Hall of Fame inductee was born in Woodville on May 11, 1895.
 Matt Tolbert, professional baseball infielder
W. P. S. Ventress (1854-1911), Mississippi state legislator
 George W. Wheeler, Chief Justice of the Connecticut Supreme Court (1920–30)
 Lester Young, jazz musician and Mississippi Musicians Hall of Fame inductee was born in Woodville.
 William Henry Young, Wisconsin politician, born in Woodville

References

External links
 History of Woodville's Jewish community (from the Institute of Southern Jewish Life)

Towns in Wilkinson County, Mississippi
Towns in Mississippi
County seats in Mississippi